The 2015–16 Incarnate Word Cardinals men's basketball team represented the University of the Incarnate Word during the 2015–16 NCAA Division I men's basketball season. The Cardinals were led by tenth year head coach Ken Burmeister and played their home games at McDermott Convocation Center. They were members of the Southland Conference. The Cardinals finished the season with a record of 17–12, 12–6 in conference play to finish in a tie for third place.

This was year three of a four-year transitional period for Incarnate Word from Division II to Division I. During year three, the Cardinals played a normal conference schedule. They were Division I for scheduling purposes and were also be considered as a Division I RPI member. Although Incarnate Word was classified as a Division I school for scheduling purposes in years two through four and can win the regular season conference title, they cannot participate in the conference tournament until the 2017–18 season at which time they will also be able to enter the NCAA Tournament, should they win the conference.

Preseason
The Cardinals were picked to finish sixth (6th) in both the Southland Conference Coaches' Poll and fifth (5th) in the Sports Information Directors Poll.

Audio streaming
All Incarnate Word games were broadcast on KKYX. KKYX's broadcasts were available at their website. KUIW Radio also produced a student media broadcast for each non-televised home game, that was to be available online, and they were to provide streaming of all non-televised home games to be shown via UIW TV.

Roster

Schedule and results
Source:

|-
!colspan=9 style="" | Non-Conference regular season

|-
!colspan=9 style="" | Southland regular season
|-

See also
2015–16 Incarnate Word Cardinals women's basketball team

References

Incarnate Word Cardinals men's basketball seasons
Incarnate Word
Incarnate Word Cardinals men's basketball
Incarnate Word Cardinals men's basketball